Twelvemile Corner is an unincorporated community in Lee County, Illinois, United States. Twelvemile Corner is located at the intersection of U.S. Route 30 and Illinois Route 251, north of Compton.

References

Unincorporated communities in Lee County, Illinois
Unincorporated communities in Illinois